John C. McGregor (born 1851) was a Scottish footballer, who played for Vale of Leven and Scotland. McGregor played four times for Scotland and scored one goal, in a 7–2 victory against England in 1878.

References

Sources

External links

London Hearts profile

1851 births
Date of birth missing
Year of death missing
Scottish footballers
Scotland international footballers
Association football forwards
Vale of Leven F.C. players